Rio Hope-Gund (born August 20, 1999) is an American soccer player who plays as a defender.

Career

Youth
Hope-Gund was a four-year starter and served as captain at Friends Seminary in Manhattan, helping his high school team to three-consecutive league wins and a state championship in 2016. He was also a four-year started with club side New York Soccer Club, helping the team to back-to-back NPL National Championships in 2015 and 2016.

College & Amateur
Hope-Gund played college soccer at Georgetown University. After redshirting in 2017, he made 16 appearances for the Hoyas including four starts and scoring two goals as the team won both the Big East regular season title and Big East tournament in 2018. In 2019, he started in all 20 games as part of a defense that posted 13 shutouts. Georgetown won all three competitions they played in: defending the Big East regular season title, winning a third consecutive Big East tournament, and claiming the first National Championship in program history. After the postponement of the 2020 fall season until spring 2021 due to the COVID-19 pandemic, Hope-Gund elected to return despite having been drafted by Orlando City in January 2021. He made a further eight appearances for the Hoyas until his departure for Orlando in April having helped the team top the conference spring series standings. He was named Big East defender of the year and earned Big East All-Conference first team honors at the end of regular season awards. In total he made 44 appearances for the Hoyas, scoring two goals and tallying two assists.

While at college, Hope-Gund played with USL League Two side Manhattan SC during the 2019 season, starting every game for the club as the team finished third in the Northeast Division.

Professional

Orlando City
On January 21, 2021, Hope-Gund was selected in the first round (19th overall) of the 2021 MLS SuperDraft by Orlando City. He missed preseason camp, electing to return to Georgetown to play during the delayed college spring season before eventually being signed by the team to a one-year contract with three option years on April 8, 2021. He spent the entire season with the team and was named as a substitute 17 times but never made an appearance and had his contract option declined at the end of the year.

Loudoun United
On February 11, 2022, Hope-Gund was announced as a signing for USL Championship side Loudoun United ahead of their 2022 season. He made his professional debut on March 12, 2022, starting and captaining Loudoun to a 1–0 win against Indy Eleven.

Personal life 
Hope-Gund's twin brother, Kofi, played soccer as a goalkeeper at Amherst College.

Career statistics

Club

Honors 
Georgetown Hoyas
Big East Conference regular season: 2018, 2019
Big East Conference Tournament: 2017, 2018, 2019
NCAA Division I Men's Soccer Tournament: 2019

Individual
Big East Defender of the Year: 2020–21

References

External links
Rio Hope-Gund at Georgetown Athletics

1998 births
American soccer players
Association football defenders
Friends Seminary alumni
Georgetown Hoyas men's soccer players
Living people
Loudoun United FC players
Orlando City SC draft picks
Orlando City SC players
Soccer players from New York (state)
USL Championship players
USL League Two players
D.C. United players